Shimikhyur is a rural locality (a selo) and the administrative centre of Shimikhyusky Selsoviet, Kurakhsky District, Republic of Dagestan, Russia. The population was 425 as of 2010. There are 6 streets.

Geography 
Shimikhyur is located 13 km northwest of Kurakh (the district's administrative centre) by road, on the Khpedzhchay River. Khpyuk and Ahsar are the nearest rural localities.

Nationalities 
Lezgins live there.

References 

Rural localities in Kurakhsky District